Sharp-tailed sparrow can refer to either of two birds once thought to be a single species:

Nelson's sparrow (Ammodramus nelsoni)
Saltmarsh sparrow (Ammodramus caudacutus)

Animal common name disambiguation pages